Jerry Weiers is the current mayor of Glendale, Arizona, a position he has held since January 2013. Prior to that, Weiers served four consecutive terms in the Arizona House of Representatives, representing Arizona's 12th District.

See also
 2012 Glendale, Arizona mayoral election
 2016 Glendale, Arizona mayoral election

References

Republican Party members of the Arizona House of Representatives
Mayors of places in Arizona
People from Glendale, Arizona
Year of birth missing (living people)
Living people